Chidden is a hamlet in Hampshire, England. Its nearest town is Waterlooville, approximately 4.5 miles away. Its nearest railway station was formerly Droxford, on the Meon Valley Railway.

References

Hamlets in Hampshire